The West Coast Wrestling Connection (WCWC) is a professional wrestling organization based in Salem, Oregon.

The WCWC was founded by Jeff Manning and Pat Kelley in 2005.

History
The WCWC had its inaugural show in Salem, Oregon on March 20, 2005. Shows are held across western Oregon, with a monthly live event in Salem.

The WCWC on PDX-TV debuted on May 24, 2014. The promotion shoots a live TV taping, typically the first Saturday of each month. These tapings were originally held at the Bob White Theatre in Southeast Portland, but have since relocated to the Jackson Armory. The television broadcasts team consists of Jeff Akin on play-by-play and Morty Lipschitz on color commentary.

Championships

Current championships

In the Spring of 2017 the WCWC introduced two new championships that would be defended exclusively on live events. Both inaugural champions were determined in tournaments, with matches being held at various live events throughout the state of Oregon.

Defunct championships

The Grappler's WCWC Academy
The Grappler runs the WCWC Training Academy in Salem, Oregon. The school is operated under the direction of lead trainer Erik Baeden.

WCWC Pacific Northwest Championship

The WCWC Pacific Northwest Championship is the top championship in the WCWC.  It was first awarded on April 24, 2005 when George Michael became the inaugural champion.

|-
!37
|Darin Corbin
|2
|July 2, 2017
|138
|Clackamas, Oregon
|It aired on WCWC on PDX-TV #162 on a tape delay date of September 2, 2017.
| 
|-
!38
|Jeff Boom
|1
|Nov 11, 2017
|51
|Clackamas, Oregon
|It aired on WCWC on PDX-TV #180
| 
|-
!39
|Jeff Boom
|2
|Jan 1, 2018
|61
|Clackamas, Oregon
|It aired on WCWC on PDX-TV #187
| 
|-
!40
|Mike Camden
|1
|Mar 3, 2018
|+
|Clackamas, Oregon
|It aired on WCWC on PDX-TV #196
|
|}

WCWC Tag Team Championship

The WCWC Tag Team Championship is the tag team championship contested in the WCCW.  It was first awarded on May 15, 2005 OTB (Memphis Raines & Mike Dempsey) became the first champions.

WCWC Legacy Championship

The WCWC Legacy Championship is a midcard championship in West Coast Wrestling Connection.  Jeremy Blanchard defeated Eric Right on September 1, 2013 to become the first champion.

See also
List of National Wrestling Alliance territories
List of independent wrestling promotions in the United States

Notes

References

External links

Independent professional wrestling promotions based on the West Coast of the United States
American professional wrestling television series
Professional wrestling in Oregon
Sports in Salem, Oregon